The Kalmykia constituency (No.15) is a Russian legislative constituency covering the entirety of Kalmykia.

Members elected

Election results

1993

|-
! colspan=2 style="background-color:#E9E9E9;text-align:left;vertical-align:top;" |Candidate
! style="background-color:#E9E9E9;text-align:left;vertical-align:top;" |Party
! style="background-color:#E9E9E9;text-align:right;" |Votes
! style="background-color:#E9E9E9;text-align:right;" |%
|-
|style="background-color:"|
|align=left|Bembya Khulkhachiyev
|align=left|Independent
|
|37.61%
|-
| colspan="5" style="background-color:#E9E9E9;"|
|- style="font-weight:bold"
| colspan="3" style="text-align:left;" | Total
| 
| 100%
|-
| colspan="5" style="background-color:#E9E9E9;"|
|- style="font-weight:bold"
| colspan="4" |Source:
|
|}

1995

|-
! colspan=2 style="background-color:#E9E9E9;text-align:left;vertical-align:top;" |Candidate
! style="background-color:#E9E9E9;text-align:left;vertical-align:top;" |Party
! style="background-color:#E9E9E9;text-align:right;" |Votes
! style="background-color:#E9E9E9;text-align:right;" |%
|-
|style="background-color:"|
|align=left|Gennady Kulik
|align=left|Agrarian Party
|
|47.68%
|-
|style="background-color:"|
|align=left|Aleksandr Golovatov
|align=left|Our Home – Russia
|
|16.64%
|-
|style="background-color:"|
|align=left|Vladimir Kolesnik
|align=left|Independent
|
|9.24%
|-
|style="background-color:#D50000"|
|align=left|Nikolay Dzhaldzhireyev
|align=left|Communists and Working Russia - for the Soviet Union
|
|7.38%
|-
|style="background-color:"|
|align=left|Anatoly Kazimirov
|align=left|Independent
|
|5.45%
|-
|style="background-color:"|
|align=left|Yelena Ubushayeva
|align=left|Yabloko
|
|2.94%
|-
|style="background-color:#265BAB"|
|align=left|Raisa Donogruppova
|align=left|Russian Lawyers' Association
|
|1.94%
|-
|style="background-color:#2C299A"|
|align=left|Olga Sivochalova
|align=left|Congress of Russian Communities
|
|0.88%
|-
|style="background-color:#FE4801"|
|align=left|Klavdia Kekelyayeva
|align=left|Pamfilova–Gurov–Lysenko
|
|0.73%
|-
|style="background-color:#0D0900"|
|align=left|Gennady Namsinov
|align=left|People's Union
|
|0.61%
|-
|style="background-color:"|
|align=left|Lev Pyurbeyev
|align=left|Faith, Work, Conscience
|
|0.51%
|-
|style="background-color:"|
|align=left|Aleksandr Karulin
|align=left|Conservative Party
|
|0.31%
|-
|style="background-color:#000000"|
|colspan=2 |against all
|
|3.91%
|-
| colspan="5" style="background-color:#E9E9E9;"|
|- style="font-weight:bold"
| colspan="3" style="text-align:left;" | Total
| 
| 100%
|-
| colspan="5" style="background-color:#E9E9E9;"|
|- style="font-weight:bold"
| colspan="4" |Source:
|
|}

1999

|-
! colspan=2 style="background-color:#E9E9E9;text-align:left;vertical-align:top;" |Candidate
! style="background-color:#E9E9E9;text-align:left;vertical-align:top;" |Party
! style="background-color:#E9E9E9;text-align:right;" |Votes
! style="background-color:#E9E9E9;text-align:right;" |%
|-
|style="background-color:"|
|align=left|Aleksandra Buratayeva
|align=left|Unity
|
|24.13%
|-
|style="background-color:"|
|align=left|Vladimir Kolesnik
|align=left|Yabloko
|
|17.28%
|-
|style="background-color:"|
|align=left|Aleksey Kucherenko
|align=left|Independent
|
|12.25%
|-
|style="background-color:"|
|align=left|Yelena Baturina
|align=left|Independent
|
|12.04%
|-
|style="background-color:"|
|align=left|Radiy Burulov
|align=left|Our Home – Russia
|
|8.41%
|-
|style="background-color:#3B9EDF"|
|align=left|Vitaly Daginov
|align=left|Fatherland – All Russia
|
|6.95%
|-
|style="background-color:"|
|align=left|Yury Badmayev
|align=left|Independent
|
|4.71%
|-
|style="background-color:"|
|align=left|Dmitry Burninov
|align=left|Independent
|
|4.54%
|-
|style="background-color:#000000"|
|colspan=2 |against all
|
|7.05%
|-
| colspan="5" style="background-color:#E9E9E9;"|
|- style="font-weight:bold"
| colspan="3" style="text-align:left;" | Total
| 
| 100%
|-
| colspan="5" style="background-color:#E9E9E9;"|
|- style="font-weight:bold"
| colspan="4" |Source:
|
|}

2003

|-
! colspan=2 style="background-color:#E9E9E9;text-align:left;vertical-align:top;" |Candidate
! style="background-color:#E9E9E9;text-align:left;vertical-align:top;" |Party
! style="background-color:#E9E9E9;text-align:right;" |Votes
! style="background-color:#E9E9E9;text-align:right;" |%
|-
|style="background-color:"|
|align=left|Gennady Kulik
|align=left|United Russia
|
|41.10%
|-
|style="background-color:"|
|align=left|Valery Ochirov
|align=left|Independent
|
|31.44%
|-
|style="background-color:"|
|align=left|Nikolay Daykhes
|align=left|Communist Party
|
|6.36%
|-
|style="background-color:"|
|align=left|Yury Sengleyev
|align=left|Independent
|
|5.48%
|-
|style="background-color:"|
|align=left|Vladimir Kolesnik
|align=left|Yabloko
|
|2.69%
|-
|style="background-color:"|
|align=left|Igor Pyshkin
|align=left|Independent
|
|1.53%
|-
|style="background-color:"|
|align=left|Yury Erdneyev
|align=left|Independent
|
|1.33%
|-
|style="background-color:"|
|align=left|Vladimir Karuev
|align=left|Independent
|
|1.03%
|-
|style="background-color:#C21022"|
|align=left|Lidia Lebedeva
|align=left|Russian Pensioners' Party-Party of Social Justice
|
|0.77%
|-
|style="background-color:"|
|align=left|Konstantin Maksimov
|align=left|Independent
|
|0.71%
|-
|style="background-color:#164C8C"|
|align=left|Vladimir Veremennikov
|align=left|United Russian Party Rus'
|
|0.32%
|-
|style="background-color:#000000"|
|colspan=2 |against all
|
|3.44%
|-
| colspan="5" style="background-color:#E9E9E9;"|
|- style="font-weight:bold"
| colspan="3" style="text-align:left;" | Total
| 
| 100%
|-
| colspan="5" style="background-color:#E9E9E9;"|
|- style="font-weight:bold"
| colspan="4" |Source:
|
|}

2016

|-
! colspan=2 style="background-color:#E9E9E9;text-align:left;vertical-align:top;" |Candidate
! style="background-color:#E9E9E9;text-align:leftt;vertical-align:top;" |Party
! style="background-color:#E9E9E9;text-align:right;" |Votes
! style="background-color:#E9E9E9;text-align:right;" |%
|-
|style="background-color:"|
|align=left|Marina Mukabenova
|align=left|United Russia
|
|63.97%
|-
|style="background-color:"|
|align=left|Lyudmila Balakleyets
|align=left|Communist Party
|
|9.53%
|-
|style="background-color: "|
|align=left|Vladimir Karuev
|align=left|Patriots of Russia
|
|6.43%
|-
|style="background:"| 
|align=left|Natalya Manzhikova
|align=left|A Just Russia
|
|5.40%
|-
|style="background:"| 
|align=left|Semyon Ateyev
|align=left|Yabloko
|
|3.99%
|-
|style="background-color:"|
|align=left|Andrey Bessarabov
|align=left|Liberal Democratic Party
|
|3.55%
|-
|style="background-color: " |
|align=left|Anatoly Zakharchenko
|align=left|Communists of Russia
|
|1.91%
|-
|style="background:"| 
|align=left|Igor Boldyrev
|align=left|Rodina
|
|1.22%
|-
|style="background-color: "|
|align=left|Sergey Manteev
|align=left|Party of Growth
|
|1.12%
|-
|style="background-color:"|
|align=left|Sergey Gabunshchin
|align=left|The Greens
|
|0.87%
|-
| colspan="5" style="background-color:#E9E9E9;"|
|- style="font-weight:bold"
| colspan="3" style="text-align:left;" | Total
| 
| 100%
|-
| colspan="5" style="background-color:#E9E9E9;"|
|- style="font-weight:bold"
| colspan="4" |Source:
|
|}

2021

|-
! colspan=2 style="background-color:#E9E9E9;text-align:left;vertical-align:top;" |Candidate
! style="background-color:#E9E9E9;text-align:left;vertical-align:top;" |Party
! style="background-color:#E9E9E9;text-align:right;" |Votes
! style="background-color:#E9E9E9;text-align:right;" |%
|-
|style="background-color:"|
|align=left|Badma Bashankayev
|align=left|United Russia
|
|40.55%
|-
|style="background-color:"|
|align=left|Sanal Ubushiyev
|align=left|Communist Party
|
|22.29%
|-
|style="background-color: "|
|align=left|Andrey Chidzhiyev
|align=left|New People
|
|8.25%
|-
|style="background-color: " |
|align=left|Natalya Manzhikova
|align=left|A Just Russia — For Truth
|
|6.88%
|-
|style="background-color: "|
|align=left|Sanal Bovayev
|align=left|Party of Pensioners
|
|4.86%
|-
|style="background-color: "|
|align=left|Vladimir Bambayev
|align=left|Russian Party of Freedom and Justice
|
|4.12%
|-
|style="background-color:"|
|align=left|Pyotr Vyshkvarok
|align=left|Liberal Democratic Party
|
|3.40%
|-
|style="background:"| 
|align=left|Khongor Marilov
|align=left|Civic Platform
|
|2.07%
|-
|style="background:"| 
|align=left|Yelena Kotenova
|align=left|Yabloko
|
|1.99%
|-
|style="background:"| 
|align=left|Tseren Ochir-Goryaev
|align=left|Rodina
|
|1.08%
|-
| colspan="5" style="background-color:#E9E9E9;"|
|- style="font-weight:bold"
| colspan="3" style="text-align:left;" | Total
| 
| 100%
|-
| colspan="5" style="background-color:#E9E9E9;"|
|- style="font-weight:bold"
| colspan="4" |Source:
|
|}

Notes

References

Russian legislative constituencies
Politics of Kalmykia